Joshua Whatley (born 2 September 2005) is a British Grand Prix motorcycle racer competing in the Moto3 World Championship for the VisionTrack Racing Team.

Career
Between 2019 and 2021, Whatley competed in the FIM CEV Moto3 Junior World Championship.

Whatley was signed to VisionTrack Racing Team alongside Scott Ogden for the 2022 campaign. Both Ogden and Whatley were retained by VisionTrack for the 2023 season.

Career statistics

British Talent Cup

Races by year

(key) (Races in bold indicate pole position; races in italics indicate fastest lap)

European Talent Cup

Races by year

(key) (Races in bold indicate pole position; races in italics indicate fastest lap)

FIM CEV Moto3 Junior World Championship

Races by year
(key) (Races in bold indicate pole position, races in italics indicate fastest lap)

Grand Prix motorcycle racing

By season

By class

Races by year
(key) (Races in bold indicate pole position; races in italics indicate fastest lap)

References

External links
 

2005 births
Living people
English motorcycle racers
Sportspeople from Chertsey
Moto3 World Championship riders